Windsor is a community located in Hants County, Nova Scotia, Canada.  It is a service centre for the western part of the county and is situated on Highway 101.

The community has a history dating back to its use by the Mi'kmaq Nation for several millennia prior to European colonization.  When the Acadians lived in the area, the town was raided by New England forces in 1704. The area was central to both Father Le Loutre's War and the Expulsion of the Acadians during the Bay of Fundy Campaign in 1755. The town promotes itself as the birthplace of ice hockey and was the home of Canada's first internationally best-selling author, Thomas Chandler Haliburton.

On April 1, 2020, the Town of Windsor amalgamated with the District of West Hants to become the West Hants Regional Municipality.

History 
Having migrated from Port Royal, Nova Scotia, the Acadians were the first Europeans to settle in Pisiguit by the early 1680s.  French census records dated 1686 list well established farms utilizing dyked marshlands.

Queen Anne's War

Raid on Pisiquid (1704) 
During Queen Anne's War, in response to the Wabanaki Confederacy of Acadia military campaign against the New England frontier and the Canadian  Raid on Deerfield, Massachusetts, Benjamin Church led the Raid on Pisiquid (1704) and burned the village to the ground. In the Raid on Pisiquid, Church burned 40 houses along with out-buildings, crops and cattle.  There was resistance and two Mi'kmaq were wounded.

Father Le Loutre's War

Despite the British Conquest of Acadia in 1710, Nova Scotia remained primarily occupied by Catholic Acadians and Mi'kmaq. Father Le Loutre's War began when Edward Cornwallis arrived to establish Halifax with 13 transports on June 21, 1749.  By unilaterally establishing Halifax the British were violating earlier treaties with the Mi'kmaq (1726), which were signed after Dummer's War. The British quickly began to build other settlements. To guard against Mi'kmaq, Acadian and French attacks on the new Protestant settlements, British fortifications were erected in Halifax (1749), Dartmouth (1750), Bedford (Fort Sackville) (1751), Lunenburg (1753) and Lawrencetown (1754).

Within 18 months of establishing Halifax, the British also took firm control of peninsula Nova Scotia by building fortifications in all the major Acadian communities: present-day Windsor (Fort Edward); Grand Pre (Fort Vieux Logis) and Chignecto (Fort Lawrence).   (A British fort already existed at the other major Acadian centre of Annapolis Royal, Nova Scotia. Cobequid remained without a fort.)  Many Acadians left this region in the Acadian Exodus, which preceded the Expulsion of the Acadians.

French and Indian War 

During the French and Indian War, Fort Edward and Windsor played a significant role in the deportation, particularly the Bay of Fundy Campaign (1755). Acadians were imprisoned in the fort as they were notified about the expulsion. Acadians numbering in the thousands were deported from mainland Nova Scotia. The deportees frequently were held on board ships for several weeks before being moved to their destinations, thus exacerbating unhealthy conditions below decks and leading to the deaths of hundreds. Many hundreds more were lost through ship sinkings and disease on board ships while en route to ports in Britain's American colonies, Britain, and France.  The British also broke apart families and sent them to different places. Their justification for this was to more efficiently put people on the boats. This resulted in more loss of life as families could not survive without essential members.

New England Planters 
The Township of Windsor was founded in 1764 by New England Planters. The next year, its first Agricultural Fair was held. This fair is still continued today, and is the oldest and longest-running such fair in North America.

American Revolution 
In the American Revolution, Windsor was an important British stronghold. Fort Edward was the headquarters in Atlantic Canada for 84th Regiment of Foot (Royal Highland Emigrants). A relief force was mustered at Windsor to crush the American-led siege at the Battle of Fort Cumberland in 1776.

Loyalists 
Following the American Revolution, Windsor was settled by United Empire Loyalists.

Plaster War 
Windsor developed its gypsum deposits, usually selling it to American markets at Passamaquoddy Bay.  Often this trade was illegal; in 1820, an effort to stop this smuggling trade resulted in the "Plaster War," in which local smugglers resoundingly defeated the efforts of New Brunswick officials to bring the trade under their control.

Kings 
The University of King's College and its secondary school, King's Collegiate School, were founded in 1788-1789 by United Empire Loyalists as Anglican academic institutions.  The college remained in the community until a disastrous fire on February 3, 1920.  In 1922 it moved to Halifax, with the assistance of the Carnegie Foundation and continues to this day.

The King's Collegiate School continued operation on the campus and was joined by a sister girls school, 'Edgehill School', in 1890.  In 1976 both institutions merged to form King's-Edgehill School, and remains the oldest independent (i.e. private) school in the Commonwealth outside of the United Kingdom.

Haliburton 
Thomas Chandler Haliburton brought fame to Windsor during the 19th century with his writings about a clockmaker named Sam Slick.

Ships, rail and roads 
In 1878, Windsor was officially incorporated as a town. Its harbour made the town a centre for shipping and shipbuilding during the age of sail.  Notable shipbuilders such as Bennett Smith built a large fleet of merchant vessels, one of the last being the ship Black Watch. As the port of registry for the massive wooden shipbuilding industry of the Minas Basin, Windsor was the homeport of one of the largest fleet of sailing ships in Canada.  Notable vessels registered at Windsor included Hamburg, the largest three masted barque built in Canada, and Kings County, the largest four masted barque. 

Following the completion of the Nova Scotia Railway's line from Halifax in 1857, the town became an important steamship connection giving Halifax access to the Bay of Fundy shipping routes. The railway continued westward as the Windsor and Annapolis Railway in 1870, eventually connecting to Yarmouth as the Dominion Atlantic Railway in 1893.  In 1901 the Midland Railway was built across Hants County, connecting Windsor with Truro. The central location of Windsor on the railway fostered the growth of numerous factories such as textile mills, fertilizer plants and furniture factories. The home of one of the industrialist families of this era, the Shands, is preserved today in Windsor as the Shand House Museum. The Windsor and Hantsport Railway took over operations from the Dominion Atlantic in 1993, making Windsor its headquarters. Rail service continued until 2011 when a crash in the gypsum market ended gypsum shipments and the railway was mothballed.

Over the course of its history, Windsor was victim to two disastrous fires, on October 17, 1897, and January 6, 1924, both of which destroyed part of the town.

In 1970, the construction of a flood-control causeway carrying Highway 101 and the Dominion Atlantic Railway across the Avon River closed Windsor off from shipping and has affected navigation in the Avon River downstream from the causeway due to excessive siltation. Highway 101 is scheduled to be upgraded to a 4-lane expressway in the future and there have been discussions about replacing the causeway with railroad and highway bridges to improve water flow. Today, the Avon River on the upstream side of the causeway which is obstructed from freely flowing into the Bay of Fundy is called 'Lake Pisiquid'.

Geography
Situated at the junction of the Avon and St. Croix Rivers, it is the largest community in the District of the Municipality of West Hants and had a 2001 population of = 3,779 residents.  Prior to the county being divided into separate municipal districts, Windsor had served as the shire town of the county. The region encompassing present day Windsor was originally part of Pisiguit, a Mi'kmaq term meaning "Junction of Waters". This name referred to the confluence of the Avon and St. Croix rivers, which flow into the Minas Basin.

Climate 

Demographics 

Arts and culture
The world's very first pumpkin regatta was held in Windsor in 1999 where people carve out The Giant Pumpkins and race across lake Pisiquid. This weird regatta now includes a motorized class where a motor is attached to the pumpkin with a flotation device.

Windsor is the location of the Mermaid Theatre of Nova Scotia. The theatre supports a touring troupe, which performs locally and internationally, as well as many children's theatre programs.

Attractions 
Windsor, NS is home to numerous attractions beginning with the claim to being the birthplace of hockey. Windsor is home to both the Cradle of Hockey which is home to Long Pond where hockey began beside Howard Dill's Farm. The town of Windsor is also home to the oldest agricultural fair in North America which is held on two separate weekends in September. The first fair was held in Windsor in the year 1765 making their 250th anniversary in 2015.

Parks
Falls Lake Provincial Park
Victoria Park
Windsor Playland Park
Windsor Waterfront Skatepark

Ice hockey 
Windsor maintains a claim as the birthplace of hockey, based upon a reference (in a novel by Thomas Haliburton) of boys from King's Collegiate School playing "hurley", on the frozen waters of Long Pond adjacent to the school's campus during the early 19th century. Students from King's-Edgehill School still play hockey on Long Pond, a pond proclaimed by some as the "Cradle of Hockey", located at the farm of Howard Dill. Windsor also boasts the oldest hockey arena in Canada, the Stannus Street Rink, which no longer hosts hockey games. The town's current arena is Hants Exhibition Arena. The town was also recently involved in the shooting of a television series called Road Hockey Rumble. The town of Windsor was also home to the historic Windsor Royals Jr. B Hockey Club, as well as the Avon River Rats Jr. C Hockey Club. The Windsor Royals Jr. B club ceased playing in the spring of 2012, but was ultimately replaced by the Valley Maple Leafs. Facing issues regarding their copyright, in June 2018 the River Rats revived the Royals brand. However, the newly named team lasted just one season before relocating to Chester, Nova Scotia as the Castaways.

Government
The town operates under a Council/Manager system of local government consisting of current elected Mayor Anna Allen, current Deputy Mayor Laurie Murley, three elected Councillors, Dave Sealey, Liz Galbraith, and John Bergante and a Chief Administrative Officer, Louis Coutinho.

Notable people 

Thomas R. Bennett
 Scott Brison
 George Elliott Clarke
 Rufus Curry
 Amor De Cosmos
 Benjamin DeWolf (Windsor merchant)
 George Henry Emerson (Twillingate and Fogo)
 James Fraser (businessman)
 Henry Goudge
 Monson Henry Goudge (son)
 Allen Haley
 Thomas Chandler Haliburton
 Lewis Herbert Martell
 Richard McHeffy
 Alden Nowlan (from nearby Stanley, Nova Scotia)
 Percy Paris
 Daniel McNeill Parker
 Chuck Porter
 Silas Tertius Rand
 Gerald Regan
 Geoff Regan
 Avon Saxon
 Jennifer Rosanne States
 Charlotte Elizabeth Tonna
 Peter Togni
 Benjamin Wier (nearby Brooklyn)
 Charles Smith Wilcox
 Lewis Morris Wilkins (speaker)
 Lewis Morris Wilkins (son)

Sister city
The sister city of Windsor is Cooperstown, New York. This is due to Windsor being the birthplace of Ice Hockey and Cooperstown being the birthplace of Baseball.

See also
 List of municipalities in Nova Scotia
King's-Edgehill School
University of King's College
The Hants Journal

References

External links
Town of Windsor
Sketch of the Old Parish Burying Ground of Windsor, Nova Scotia  By Henry Youle Hind. 1888.

Further reading 
 Joshua M. Smith, Borderland Smuggling: Patriots, Loyalists, and Illicit Trade in the Northeast, 1783-1820 (Gainesville: University Press of Florida, 2006).
 Garth Vaughan, The Puck stops Here: The origin of Canada's great game - Ice Hockey, (Goose Lane Editions, 1996)

Communities in Hants County, Nova Scotia
Former towns in Nova Scotia
General Service Areas in Nova Scotia